Meravanige (Kannada: ಮೆರವಣಿಗೆ) is a 2008 Indian Kannada romantic drama film directed by Mahesh Babu and starring Prajwal Devaraj and Aindrita Ray.

Cast
Prajwal Devaraj as Vijay
Aindrita Ray
Sadhu Kokila
Komal
Harish
Vinayak Joshi
Bhanu Chander
Avinash
Sudha 
Vidya Murthy
Rajaram. H. S. 
Jaidev 
Roopesh Gowda 
Ravi Kale as Basheer
Ramya as Guest appearance

Soundtrack
The soundtrack was composed by V. Manohar.

Reception 
A critic from Rediff.com wrote that "Watch Meravanige for its freshness and visuals".

References

External links 
Review

2008 films
2000s Kannada-language films
Films scored by V. Manohar